Auguste-Michel Colle (January 7, 1872 – September 16, 1949), sometimes known as Michel-Auguste Colle, a French painter of the Nancy school, active from c. 1900 to c. 1940. His pictures are in a number of private and public collections in France and elsewhere, including the Musée d'Arts de Nantes, the Musée des Beaux-Arts de Nancy, the Musée de l'École de Nancy; the Musée de l'Histoire du Fer, also in Nancy; the Pierre Noël Museum in Saint Dié: and the Musée des Marais Salants, in Batz-Sur-Mer.

Colle was born on January 7, 1872, in Baccarat (Meurthe et Moselle), France, and died in Batz-sur-Mer, September 16, 1949. Orphaned in 1885, he apprenticed at the Baccarat crystal works as a gilder and engraver. After studying painting with Charles Peccatte, an artist from Lorraine working in Baccarat, he met Eugène Corbin, a department store owner and art collector, who introduced Colle to the painters Charles de Meixmoron de Dombasle, Émile Friant and Victor Prouvé (Prouvé was then a professor at the Ecole des Beaux-Arts in Nancy). In 1905, he married the sister of Victor Prouvé's wife.

Colle exhibited at the Nancy Salon of 1905, and the Parisian Salon of French Artists in 1909, 1912, 1913, and 1914. He continued to exhibit at Salons in France and in the Hague through the 1930s. In 1940, he settled permanently in the village of Kervalet, near Batz-sur-Mer.

In October 1971, the Kaplan Gallery in London organized a major exhibition and sale of works by Colle with 33 oils by the artist. A retrospective exhibition was organized at the Pierre Noël Museum in Saint Dié in 2009, and in 2014 the Salt Marshes Museum in Batz-Sur-Mer organized an exhibition "Lights in Presqu'ile - Michel Colle, painter in Kervalet", with a published catalog.

References 

1872 births
1949 deaths
20th-century French painters
French male painters
People from Meurthe-et-Moselle
20th-century French male artists
People from Loire-Atlantique